Anderson model may refer to:
 Anderson impurity model, used in physics to describe heavy fermion systems and Kondo insulators
 Anderson model of localization (Anderson localization), in condensed matter physics, the absence of diffusion of waves in a disordered medium